The Dix House is a historic home in Ormond Beach, Florida, United States.  On September 6, 1989, it was added to the U.S. National Register of Historic Places.

The Dix house was originally built by Colonel Dix for his two sisters. The second floor of the Dix House was built open and used extensively for a wide variety of purposes including an early wedding hall and meeting place. The second floor of the Dix House was called, "Dix Hall" was the site that the colony of New Britain chose to become the City of Ormond on April 22, 1880.

More recently the Dix House suffered extensive damage in the hurricanes that visited the area in 2004. In 2007–2008, the home was extensively renovated under the guidance of the historical society to create a period accurate home, with modern amenities.  It now has five bedrooms (each with a private bath) and an elevator. The home was purchased in 2016 by Chobee and Becky Ebbets, long time residents of Ormond Beach.

References

External links
 Volusia County listings at National Register of Historic Places
 Volusia County listings  at Florida's Office of Cultural and Historical Programs

Houses on the National Register of Historic Places in Volusia County, Florida
Ormond Beach, Florida
Houses completed in 1878
Vernacular architecture in Florida
1870s establishments in Florida